The 1944 Paris–Tours was the 38th edition of the Paris–Tours cycle race and was held on 7 May 1944. The race started in Paris and finished in Tours. The race was won by Lucien Teisseire.

General classification

References

1944 in French sport
1944
May 1944 sports events